This is a list of Lightning sailboat championships.

Open World Championships

Masters World Championships

Youth World Championships

References

Lightning (dinghy)
World championships in sailing